Prasad V. Tetali is an Indian-American mathematician and computer scientist who works as a professor at the Georgia Institute of Technology, with a joint appointment in mathematics and the College of Computing. His research concerns probability theory, discrete mathematics, and approximation algorithms.

Tetali was born in Visakhapatnam, India but is now a United States citizen. He graduated from Andhra University in 1984, earned a master's degree in computer science in 1986 from the Indian Institute of Science, and completed his doctorate in 1991 at the Courant Institute of Mathematical Sciences of New York University under the supervision of Joel Spencer. After postdoctoral studies, he joined the School of Mathematics at Georgia Tech in 1994, and added a joint appointment in computing in 2001. At Georgia Tech, his doctoral students have included Adam Marcus. He was editor-in-chief of SIAM Journal on Discrete Mathematics from 2009 to 2011.

Tetali became a fellow of the Society for Industrial and Applied Mathematics in 2009, and one of the inaugural fellows of the American Mathematical Society in 2012.

References

Year of birth missing (living people)
Living people
American computer scientists
20th-century American mathematicians
21st-century American mathematicians
Indian computer scientists
20th-century Indian mathematicians
Theoretical computer scientists
Indian Institute of Science alumni
Georgia Tech faculty
Fellows of the American Mathematical Society
Fellows of the Society for Industrial and Applied Mathematics
Courant Institute of Mathematical Sciences alumni
Scientists from Visakhapatnam
Andhra University College of Engineering alumni
Andhra University alumni